Casey Sablowski (née Eastham; born 19 March 1989, in Shellharbour) is an Australian women's field hockey player. Sablowski plays as a midfielder.

She made her debut for the Australia women's national hockey team, commonly referred to as the Hockeyroos, at age 17. Her Australian Hockey League (AHL) team is the New South Wales Arrows. Sablowski was a talented junior player; she was selected into the Australian under-21s team to compete in the Junior World Cup in 2005 at the age of 16. At this tournament she was named one of the best players for the under-21s age group in the world.

After making the 2008 Beijing Olympic team, Sablowski was described by Australian coach, Frank Murray, as possibly becoming the best player in the world. Since making her debut, she has been a key member of the Hockeyroos. She scored four goals at the 2008 Beijing Olympics and at the 2009 Women's Champions Trophy in Sydney, Sablowski again scored four goals making her the second highest goal scorer at the tournament and Australia's highest goal scorer. She was a very important member of the Hockeyroos that competed in the 2009 Champions Trophy in Sydney that won silver against Argentina. In 2009 Sablowski was named the International Young Player of the Year and was named in the International All Star Team.

At the 2010 Commonwealth Games in Delhi, she was a member of the Australian team that won the gold medal by defeating New Zealand 4–2 on penalty strokes.

In 2012 she competed for Australia at the 2012 Summer Olympics.

In 2014, she was part of the Australian team that won gold at the 20th Commonwealth Games. She scored the first penalty in the shoot out that decided the final against England.

In 2016, she played in the Rio 2016 Olympic Games.

References

External links
 
 
 

Australian female field hockey players
1989 births
Living people
Olympic field hockey players of Australia
Field hockey players at the 2008 Summer Olympics
Field hockey players at the 2010 Commonwealth Games
Commonwealth Games gold medallists for Australia
Field hockey players at the 2012 Summer Olympics
Field hockey players at the 2014 Commonwealth Games
Field hockey players at the 2016 Summer Olympics
Commonwealth Games medallists in field hockey
Sportswomen from New South Wales
21st-century Australian women
Field hockey people from New South Wales
Medallists at the 2010 Commonwealth Games
Medallists at the 2014 Commonwealth Games